The Regina Maria Pia class was a group of four ironclad warships built for the Italian Regia Marina (Royal Navy) in the 1860s. They were built by French shipyards, since Italian yards were unable to meet the demand of the rapidly expanding Italian fleet. The ships were broadside ironclads and mounted a battery of twenty-six muzzle loading guns.

All four ships saw action at the Battle of Lissa during the Third Italian War of Independence in 1866. Regina Maria Pia was badly burned in the battle, but the other three vessels were not seriously damaged. The ships served in a variety of roles for the remainder of their long careers; they were modernized in the late 1880s and thereafter used as a training ships. Regina Maria Pia, San Martino, and Ancona were discarded in 1903–1904, and Castelfidardo joined them in the breaker's yard in 1910.

Design
Following the unification of Italy in 1861, the new Regia Marina (Royal Navy) began a construction program to prepare a fleet of ironclad warships capable of defeating the Austrian Navy. Italy considered the Austrian Empire to be its main rival, since it controlled predominantly Italian areas, including Venice. The nascent Italian shipyards were incapable of building the number of ships the new fleet would require, so most of this first generation of ironclads were built by foreign ship builders. In 1862, the four ships of the Regina Maria Pia class were ordered from French shipyards, under the direction of Vice Admiral Carlo Pellion di Persano, then the Italian Navy Minister. These ships were designed by the French builders.

General characteristics and machinery

The ships of the Regina Maria Pia class varied in their dimensions. Regina Maria Pia and San Martino, built by the same shipyard, were identical in size, while Castelfidardo and Ancona, though each built by different shipyards, also were identical.

The ships were constructed with iron hulls. They had an inverted bow with a pronounced ram below the waterline. Each vessel had a crew of 480–485 officers and men. The ships were initially schooner-rigged to supplement the steam engine, though their masts were later reduced to a barque rig. Ultimately, they lost their sailing rig completely, having it replaced with a pair of military masts with fighting tops.

The ships' propulsion system consisted of one single-expansion, two-cylinder steam engine that drove a single screw propeller, with steam supplied by six coal-fired, rectangular fire-tube boilers. The boilers were trunked into a single funnel placed amidships.

Armament
The Regina Maria Pia class were broadside ironclads, and they were initially armed with a main battery of four 72-pounder smooth-bore  muzzle-loading guns and twenty-two 32-pounder rifled  muzzle loaders, though their armament changed throughout her career. Most of these guns were placed on the broadside, but two of the 164 mm guns were mounted in an armored bunker forward and a third was placed in a similar mount at the stern, as chase guns.

In 1871, all four ships were re-armed with two  muzzle-loading guns and eight 8 in muzzle-loading guns, with a ninth 8 in gun added in 1880. Regina Maria Pia and San Martino were later re-equipped with eight  quick-firing (QF) guns, five  QF guns, four  QF guns, and eight  Hotchkiss revolver cannon. In 1884, Castelfidardo received the same battery of light guns, though she had a sixth 4.7 in gun. When Ancona was similarly re-armed, she only had two of the 37 mm revolver cannon. All four ships were also equipped with three torpedo tubes, with the exception of Castelfidardo, which received two tubes.

Ships

Service history

All four ships of the class entered service in time to see action during the Third Italian War of Independence against the Austrian Navy in 1866. Persano, now the commander of the Italian fleet, adopted a cautious strategy and conducted only one major offensive operation, which was directed at the island of Lissa. There, the Austrian fleet under Wilhelm von Tegetthoff attacked the Italians. The four Regina Maria Pias all took part in the ensuing Battle of Lissa. Regina Maria Pia had been set on fire and badly burned in the battle, and minor fires were started by Austrian shells aboard San Martino and Castelfidardo, but neither were seriously damaged. Ancona emerged relatively unscathed, with only minor damage to her iron plates.

After the war, the Italian naval budget was slashed; the cuts were so severe that the fleet had great difficulty in mobilizing its ironclad squadron to attack the port of Civitavecchia in September 1870, as part of the wars of Italian unification. Instead, the ships were laid up and the sailors conscripted to man them were sent home. As the Italian fleet began to rebuild in the 1870s, the Regina Maria Pias returned to active service in a variety of roles, both in the main fleet and in Italy's overseas empire. All four ships were modernized in the late 1880s, and were thereafter used as training ships. Regina Maria Pia, Ancona, and San Martino were stricken from the naval register in 1903–1904, while Castelfidardo lingered on as a torpedo training ship until 1910, when she too was sold for scrapping.

Footnotes

Notes

Citations

References

External links
 Classe Regina Maria Pia Marina Militare website